Wojnar is a Polish surname. Notable people with the surname include:

 Jerzy Wojnar (1930–2005), Polish pilot and luger
 Petr Wojnar (born 1989), Czech footballer
 Theodore J. Wojnar (born 1930), US Coast Guard rear admiral
 William A. Wojnar (born 1951), American classical organist and professor

Polish-language surnames